Ellenberger is a surname. Notable people with the surname include:

C. Leroy Ellenberger (born 1942), American academic
Gisela Ellenberger (born 1950), German runner
Irene Ellenberger (born 1946), German architect
Jake Ellenberger (born 1985), American mixed martial artist 
Jules Ellenberger (1871–1973), Imperial civil servant
Henri Ellenberger (1905–1993), Canadian psychiatrist, medical historian, and criminologist
Norm Ellenberger (1932–2015), American basketball coach
Paul Ellenberger (1919-2016), French ichnologist

See also
Ellenberger Cottage